WSST-TV (channel 55) is a television station licensed to Cordele, Georgia, United States, affiliated with MyNetworkTV. It is owned by Marquee Broadcasting alongside Valdosta-licensed CBS affiliate WSWG (channel 44). WSST-TV's studios (which also house master control and some internal operations for WSWG) are located on 7th Street and 11th Avenue in downtown Cordele, and its transmitter is located in rural southwestern Crisp County.

Since April 22, 2019, in order to increase its over-the-air reach, WSST-TV's primary channel has been simulcast on WSWG's third digital subchannel.

History

WSST-TV signed on May 22, 1989, as an independent station owned by Sunbelt-South Telecommunications Ltd. The station grew out of a cable-only station for Cordele and Vienna that had started in 1981. Though primarily independent, at various points WSST's schedule has included programming from Channel America, America One, and Youtoo America. WSST was originally jointly owned by William B. Goodson and Phillip A. Streetman; Goodson died in 2006, and Streetman assumed full control in 2007.

On June 18, 2018, Marquee Broadcasting agreed to purchase WSST from Sunbelt-South Telecommunications. The sale was completed on September 3, 2018. Marquee subsequently acquired CBS affiliate WSWG from Gray Television, making it a sister station to WSST. In May 2019, WSST-TV affiliated with MyNetworkTV; the affiliation was transferred from a WSWG subchannel.

Local programming
WSST-TV airs a rebroadcast of sister station WSWG's early evening newscast and a prime time newscast, which launched on May 6, 2019; prior to then, WSST produced its own evening newscast. Until 2022, WSST also produced South Georgia Sunrise, a two-hour morning news and talk program, and Midday, a half-hour talk and lifestyle program.

Technical information

Subchannels
The station's digital signal is multiplexed:

Analog-to-digital conversion
WSST-TV began broadcasting a digital signal in 2003. Its digital transmitter facilities operated at low power for several years, due to Sunbelt-South Telecommunications, Ltd. being involved in bankruptcy proceedings. The station discontinued regular programming on its analog signal, over UHF channel 55, on April 15, 2009. WSST's digital signal broadcast on its pre-transition UHF channel 51. The station moved to channel 22 in early 2017, and to channel 34 in late 2018.

References

External links

Television stations in Georgia (U.S. state)
MyNetworkTV affiliates
MeTV affiliates
Heroes & Icons affiliates
Grit (TV network) affiliates
Ion Mystery affiliates
Laff (TV network) affiliates
Television channels and stations established in 1989
1989 establishments in Georgia (U.S. state)
Crisp County, Georgia
Marquee Broadcasting